"What Other People Say" is a song by Australian singer-songwriter Sam Fischer and American singer Demi Lovato. It was released on 4 February 2021 by RCA and Island Records on digital download and streaming formats as the second single from Lovato's seventh studio album Dancing with the Devil... the Art of Starting Over. The song was written by both Lovato and Fischer alongside Geoff Warburton and Ryan Williamson.

At the 2021 ARIA Music Awards, the song was nominated for Song of the Year.

Background and composition
"What Other People Say" was announced via social media on 2 February 2021. Posting to Twitter, Lovato said "these lyrics are so special to my heart" and that they could not wait to share the track. Fischer later shared a snippet of the track via TikTok where the audio was used in over 15,000 videos before its official release. 

Fischer wrote the song years ago, initially for another artist, and said in a statement that he always knew that the song was destined to be a duet. Fischer said he was "blown away" when Lovato agreed to sing on the track with him, and added that the song is "a confession, realizing how far away you can get from who you are in an effort to be liked." 

About his collaboration with Lovato, Fischer told Metro that Lovato was "incredible" and he was "honoured to have Lovato on ['What Other People Say'] and [...] connected deeply with the song". "What Other People Say" is about the "feeling of being alone and not wanting to let people down". Lovato said, "This song is a reflection on what it's like to lose who you truly are in an effort to please other people and society. It's why I wanted to make this song with Sam – ultimately it's about two humans coming together to connect and find solutions to their problems". Fischer described that the song as "about the pressures of society and how getting caught up with the wrong things can change you."

Critical reception
Upon the song's release, Jennifer Drysdale from Entertainment Tonight called the duet a "moving song" between Lovato and Fischer, and noted how Lovato was a "fitting duet partner" on the song. Danielle Pascual from Billboard ranked the song as one of Lovato's best collaborations in her entire discography, describing it as a "powerful emotional ballad" that "showcases her varied range while giving Fischer room to soar".

Music video
The official music video was released on Lovato and Fischer's YouTube channels on 16 February 2021. It depicts the pair performing the song inside of and atop a moving train.

Lyric video
The lyric video, released on YouTube, shows Lovato and Fischer as cartoon characters in a Guess Who?-style board game, and the cartoons reflect the stereotypical labels society imposes on Lovato and Fischer, including "Angelic, Naughty, Scary, Aloof" for Lovato.

Track listing
Digital download
"What Other People Say" – 3:14

Digital download – Sam Feldt Remix
"What Other People Say" (Sam Feldt Remix) – 3:01

Digital download – Stripped Version
"What Other People Say" (Stripped Version) – 3:28

Digital download – R3HAB Remix
"What Other People Say" (R3HAB Remix) – 2:34

Personnel

Song credits
Recording and management
Recorded at Westlake Recording Studios (Los Angeles, California)
Mixed at Henson Recording Studio (Los Angeles, California)
Mastered at Sterling Sound Studios (Edgewater, New Jersey)
Published by DDLovato Music/Universal Music Corp. (ASCAP), Sony/ATC Music Publishing, Geoff Warburton (SOCAN), Sony/ATV Ballad (BMI), Sam Fischer (SESAC)

Personnel

Sam Fischer – vocals, composition, choir
Demi Lovato – vocals, composition
Ryan "Rykeyz" Williamson – production, composition, programming, drums, bass, keyboards, percussion, vocal production, string orchestration, choir
Geoff Warburton – composition
Mitch Allan – vocal production
Scott Robinson – recording
Ryan Dulude – recording
Josh Gudwin – mixing
Heidi Wang – assistant mixing
Pat McManus – guitar
David Davidson – violin
David Angell – violin
Conni Ellisor – violin
Karen Winkelmann – violin
Jane Darnall – violin
Monisa Angell – viola
Elizabeth Lamb – viola
Steve Epting – choir
Vegaz Taelor – choir
Chelsea "Peaches" West – choir
Alexis James – choir
Kaye Fox – choir
Desiree "DeSz" Washington – choir
Ayanna Elese – choir
Erin Cafferky – choir
Chris Gehringer – mastering

Credits adapted from the liner notes of Dancing with the Devil... the Art of Starting Over.

Music video credits
Music video credits adapted from YouTube.

 Dano Cerny – director 
 Michelle Larkin – producer 
 Missy Galanida – executive producer 
 Isaac Rice – executive producer 
 Nicholas Weisnet – director of photographer 
 Elizabet Puksto – art director 
 Jennifer Kennedy – editor 
 Matt Osborne – colorist 
 Ingenuity Studios – VFX

Charts

Weekly charts

Year-end charts

Certifications

Release history

References

2020s ballads
2021 singles
2021 songs
Demi Lovato songs
Sam Fischer songs
Male–female vocal duets
Island Records singles
RCA Records singles
Songs written by Demi Lovato
Songs written by Geoff Warburton
Songs written by Sam Fischer